Bacidina sorediata is a species of lichen in the family Ramalinaceae. Found in Africa, it was described as new to science in 2011 by Mark Seaward and Robert Lücking.

References

sorediata
Lichen species
Lichens described in 2011
Lichens of Africa
Taxa named by Robert Lücking